Lady Eveningstar or Lady Ikʼ Skull (704-751), was a Maya queen and possible regent, wife of Itzamnaaj Bʼalam II, a Maya king of Yaxchilan. Their son, Yaxun Bʼalam IV - "Bird Jaguar", succeeded his father as king. She was possibly a regent for a period.

Biography 
Lady Eveningstar came to Yaxchilan from Calakmul. She was a secondary wife to Shield Jaguar the Great (Itzamnaaj Bʼalam II).

Although a secondary wife, Lady Ikʼ Skull may have ruled for a short time in Yaxchilan's history until her son Yaxun Bʼalam IV was old enough to take the throne. A review of the dynastic history of Yaxchilan during Itzamnaaj Bahlam's reign indicates that he had three wives: his aunt Lady Xoc, Lady Sak Bʼiyaan and Lady Ikʼ Skull, with Lady Xoc as the primary wife. Upon the death of Itzamnaaj Bahlam, the right to the throne would traditionally go to his heir through Lady Xoc's line; however, this is not what happened and nearly ten years after his death it is his son from Lady Ikʼ Skull that took the throne.

There is a great deal of speculation as to why the son of a secondary wife took the throne and did so after the king had been dead for ten years. The current thinking is that the rightful heir through Lady Xook's lineage may have been her son, or perhaps a nephew or brother, but that this individual was captured during a conflict with Dos Pilas in 745. Information regarding this "interregnum" period tends to be conflicting. In their second revised edition, Martin and Grube note that at Piedras Negras there is mention of a new king at Yaxchilan, Yopaat Bahlam II, who may have ruled for part or all of this period. However, supporting evidence for this is unknown from Yaxchilan. On the other hand, Josserand notes that Lady Ikʼ Skull ruled as regent during this time and that it was not until her death that Bird Jaguar IV took the throne.

A monument which refers to Lady Ikʼ Skull is stela 35.

References 

 Gustafson, Lowell. (1999). Gender Relations and Political Legitimacy: Replacing Patrilineal with Ancestral Inheritance of Power in Ancient Mayan Society.
 Schele, Linda, & David Freidel. (1990). A Forest of Kings: The Untold Story of the Ancient Maya. New York, New York: William Morrow and Company Inc.

Eveningstar
8th-century women rulers
Queens consort
704 births
751 deaths
Rulers of Yaxchilan
Calakmul